Zulma Yared Hernández García (born 2 August 1998) is a Mexican footballer who plays as an attacking midfielder for Liga MX Femenil club América and the Mexico women's national team.

International career
Hernández made her senior debut for Mexico on 5 April 2019 in a 0–2 friendly loss to the Netherlands.

References

External links 
 

1995 births
Living people
Mexican women's footballers
Women's association football midfielders
Footballers from Mexico City
Liga MX Femenil players
Club América (women) footballers
Mexico women's international footballers
20th-century Mexican women
21st-century Mexican women
Mexican footballers